The YMCA Building is a historic building located in Council Bluffs, Iowa, United States.  Construction of the building was partially funded by railroad magnet Grenville M. Dodge.  The front section, designed by local architect Frederic E. Cox, was completed in 1909.  The  pool/gymnasium addition in the rear of the building was designed by J. Chris Jensen, another local architect, and completed in 1931.  The front section is four stories tall and  exhibits elements of the Colonial Revival and Federal styles.  The fourth floor was renovated in 1931 and the shed dormers may have been added at that time.  The rear addition is architecturally sympathetic to the original section of the building.  The Union Pacific Railroad bought the building in 1929 so the facilities would be available for the men who worked on the railroad during the Great Depression.  The local YMCA took over ownership again in 1955.  The building was listed on the National Register of Historic Places in 1979.

References

Buildings and structures completed in 1909
Buildings and structures in Council Bluffs, Iowa
National Register of Historic Places in Pottawattamie County, Iowa
Clubhouses on the National Register of Historic Places in Iowa
Georgian Revival architecture in Iowa
YMCA buildings in the United States